Lincoln poems may refer to:

Poetry of Abraham Lincoln
Poetry on Abraham Lincoln
 Walt Whitman's poems on Abraham Lincoln